Eurocrack sometimes stylized as  is a Finnish rap act made up of Finnish rappers RPK and Julma-Henri. The duo was formed in 2012 with a major album release Huume (stylized as ) in June 2013.

Career
Julma-Henri (also known as JLMA HNRI, Henri, Henkka, LL Julma H, Jääkarhu-Make, Money, Pepsi P) was previously well-known since 2007 as Julma-Henri & Syrjäytyneet with a number of albums, notably Al-Qaida Finland (2007), SRJTNT vol. 1 and Radio Jihad... Syrjäytynyt vol. 2 (2008, 2011).

With RPK (real name Roope Kinnunen also known as RoopeK, RRKK, RPK, Esaar, Koksukoo, Koksu Koo, Kokkelikoo, Mörkö, Supertuottaja, Rrimöykk, Rumpukone), formerly of Ceebrolistics, the two had started an artistic cooperation together in 2010 releasing a number of works together including EPs, such as Kutsu EP (2010) and ”HENRI” (2012). Their third work together Euro Crack EP (2012)  is considered a beginning of the Eurocrack project that blossomed with a charting studio album released in July 2013. Eurocrack's studio album Huume (in English The Drug, stylized as ) was released on 28 June 2013Morssi website and has appeared at number 7 on the Official Finnish Album Chart

Discography
Albums and EPs
as Julma-Henri & RPK
2010: Kutsu EP 
2011: "HENRI"as JLMA HNRI X RPK
2012: Euro Crack EP''

as Eurocrack

Singles / Music videos
2012: "E.U.R.O.C.R.A.C.K." (JLMA HNRI X RPK / EURO CRACK)
2012: "Pommi" (JLMA HNRI X RPK / EURO CRACK)
2013: "Spaced Out" (Eurocrack)
2013: "Douppii Douppaa" (Eurocrack)
2013: "Kräkkä Kränkkä" (Eurocrack)

References

External links
Official website www.eurocrack.com
Eurocrack YouTube TV channel

Finnish rappers